Asafi Harawi (1449 – 1517), was a Persian poet active during the late Timurid era. Born in Herat, Asafi belonged to a family of bureaucrats. His father had served as the vizier of the Timurid ruler Abu Sa'id Mirza, while his grandfather, Ala al-Din Ali, had served as a government official under Timur.

References

Sources 
 
 

Poets from the Timurid Empire
15th-century Persian-language poets
16th-century Persian-language poets
1449 births
1517 deaths
People from Herat